Cathedral of the Immaculate Conception may refer to:

Austria
Cathedral of the Immaculate Conception, Linz

Benin
Basilique de l'Immaculée Conception, Ouidah

Bolivia
Immaculate Conception Cathedral, Concepción

Burkina Faso
Ouagadougou Cathedral, Ouagadougou

Canada
Cathedral of the Immaculate Conception (Saint John, New Brunswick)

Chile
Immaculate Conception Cathedral, Iquique

China
Cathedral of the Immaculate Conception, Beijing
Cathedral of the Immaculate Conception (Changsha)
Cathedral of the Immaculate Conception, Chengdu
Cathedral of the Immaculate Conception (Hangzhou)
Cathedral of the Immaculate Conception (Hong Kong)
Cathedral of the Immaculate Conception (Nanjing)
Cathedral of the Immaculate Conception, Taiyuan
Immaculate Conception Cathedral, Ürümqi

Colombia
Cathedral Basilica of the Immaculate Conception, Santa Fe de Antioquia
Immaculate Conception Cathedral, Neiva

Dominican Republic
Immaculate Conception Cathedral, La Vega

Ecuador
Immaculate Conception Cathedral, Puerto Baquerizo Moreno

East Timor
Immaculate Conception Cathedral, Dili

Greece
Immaculate Conception Cathedral, Thessaloniki

Grenada
Immaculate Conception Cathedral, St. George's

Guyana
Immaculate Conception Cathedral, Georgetown

Honduras
Immaculate Conception Cathedral, Comayagua
Immaculate Conception Cathedral, Juticalpa

India
Immaculate Conception Cathedral, Pondicherry
St. Mary's Immaculate Conception Cathedral, Ranchi

Ireland
Cathedral of the Immaculate Conception (Sligo)

Korea
Immaculate Conception Cathedral, Jeju

Madagascar
Immaculate Conception Cathedral, Antananarivo

Mexico
Immaculate Conception Cathedral, Córdoba
 Cathedral Basilica of the Immaculate Conception, Durango
 Cathedral Basilica of the Immaculate Conception, Mazatlán
 Immaculate Conception Cathedral, Apatzingán
 Immaculate Conception Cathedral, Celaya
 Immaculate Conception Cathedral, Matehuala
 Immaculate Conception Cathedral, Tampico
 Immaculate Conception Cathedral, Tepic
 Immaculate Conception Cathedral, Zamora de Hidalgo

Montenegro
Immaculate Conception Cathedral, Bar

Morocco
Roman Catholic Cathedral of Tangier

Panama
Immaculate Conception Cathedral, Colón

Peru
Immaculate Conception Cathedral, Pucallpa,

Philippines
Metropolitan Cathedral-Basilica Minore of the Immaculate Conception in Manila
Immaculate Conception Cathedral-Basilica, Malolos, Bulacan
Immaculate Conception Metropolitan Cathedral (Roxas)
Metropolitan Cathedral of the Immaculate Conception (Zamboanga)
Immaculate Conception Cathedral, Antipolo
Immaculate Conception Cathedral, Basco
Immaculate Conception Cathedral, Boac
Immaculate Conception Cathedral, Cubao, Quezon City
Immaculate Conception Cathedral, Pasig
Immaculate Conception Cathedral, Puerto Princesa

Russia
Cathedral of the Immaculate Conception (Moscow)
Immaculate Conception Church, Perm
Immaculate Conception Church, Smolensk

Saint Lucia
Cathedral Basilica of the Immaculate Conception in Castries

Seychelles
 Immaculate Conception Cathedral, Seychelles

South Africa
Immaculate Conception Cathedral, Pella

South Korea 
 Myeongdong Cathedral, Seoul

Taiwan
Immaculate Conception Cathedral, Taipei

Thailand
Immaculate Conception Church, Bangkok
Cathedral of the Immaculate Conception, Chanthaburi

Tonga
Cathedral of the Immaculate Conception, Tonga (Nuku'alofa)

Trinidad and Tobago
Cathedral Basilica of the Immaculate Conception (Port of Spain)

Thailand
Cathedral of the Immaculate Conception (Thailand)

Ukraine
Cathedral of the Immaculate Conception of the Blessed Virgin Mary, Ternopil

United States
Cathedral Basilica of the Immaculate Conception (Mobile, Alabama)
Old Saint Mary's Cathedral, San Francisco, California
Cathedral Basilica of the Immaculate Conception (Denver), listed on the NRHP in Denver, Colorado
Cathedral of the Immaculate Conception (Springfield, Illinois)
Cathedral of the Immaculate Conception (Fort Wayne, Indiana), listed on the NRHP in Indiana
Cathedral of the Immaculate Conception (Wichita, Kansas)
Cathedral of the Immaculate Conception (Lake Charles, Louisiana), listed on the NRHP in Louisiana
Cathedral of the Immaculate Conception (Portland, Maine), listed on the NRHP in Maine
Cathedral of the Immaculate Conception (Kansas City, Missouri)
Cathedral of the Immaculate Conception (Crookston, Minnesota), former cathedral listed on the NRHP in Minnesota
Cathedral of the Immaculate Conception (Camden, New Jersey)
Cathedral of the Immaculate Conception (Albany, New York), listed on the NRHP in New York
Cathedral of the Immaculate Conception (Syracuse, New York)
St. Mary's Cathedral of the Immaculate Conception (Portland, Oregon)
Cathedral of the Immaculate Conception (Philadelphia), Pennsylvania
Cathedral of the Immaculate Conception (Memphis, Tennessee)
Immaculate Conception Cathedral (Brownsville, Texas), listed on the NRHP in Texas
Cathedral of the Immaculate Conception (Tyler, Texas)
Cathedral of the Immaculate Conception (Burlington, Vermont)

Venezuela
 Cathedral Basilica of the Immaculate Conception (Mérida, Venezuela)
 Cathedral of the Immaculate Conception (San Carlos, Cojedes)

Zimbabwe
Cathedral Basilica of the Immaculate Conception (Bulawayo)

See also
 Basilica Cathedral (disambiguation)
 Basilica of the Immaculate Conception (disambiguation)
 Cathedral Basilica (disambiguation)
 Cathedral of Saint Mary of the Immaculate Conception (disambiguation)
 Church of the Immaculate Conception (disambiguation)